Micah Franklin may refer to:

 Micah Franklin (baseball) (born 1972), American baseball player
 Micah Franklin (squash player) (born 1992), Bermudian squash player